Tour of Libya was a professional road cycling stage race held annually each March in Libya. The circuit is 860 km long. Tour of Libya was part of the UCI Africa Tour.

Past winners

References 

Cycle races in Libya
UCI Africa Tour races
Recurring sporting events established in 2007
2007 establishments in Libya